Greens Creek is a rural locality in the Gympie Region, Queensland, Australia. In the  Greens Creek had a population of 326 people.

History 
Gympie East State School opened on 25 January 1965.

In the  Greens Creek had a population of 326 people.

Education 
Gympie East State School is a government primary (Prep-6) school for boys and girls at 219 Cedar Pocket Road. In 2018, the school had an enrolment of 140 students with 10 teachers (8 full-time equivalent) and 9 non-teaching staff (6 full-time equivalent).

References 

Gympie Region
Localities in Queensland